The Moe incest case emerged in February 2007 when a woman, identified only as "M" for legal reasons, reported to Victoria Police in the Australian town of Moe, Victoria that her 63-year-old father, RSJ, had raped her, physically abused her and kept her prisoner in her own home between 1977 and 2005.

Background 
Police first learned about the alleged abuse in 2005, when M first came forward, but could not act because she did not want to co-operate after her father threatened violence against her mother and siblings.

The J family had been known to authorities for more than 30 years at the time the abuse came to light; three of RSJ's six children with his wife had died and others have spent time in state care. The allegations first emerged in a news report, that said authorities had failed to investigate after being warned of the abuse years earlier.

During the years of abuse, M gave birth to four of her father's children, each in major hospitals in the state capital Melbourne. One child, a girl, died from severe brain and respiratory developmental problems at eleven weeks of age; two of the surviving boys are seriously intellectually disabled; and the third boy has a major speech impediment and social interaction problems. None of the children had fathers listed on their birth certificates, raising concerns about why questions were not asked at the time. The victim's mother was allegedly unaware of any abuse, despite sharing a house with her daughter, husband, and grandchildren until 2005.

Trial
RSJ was charged with 83 sexual abuse offences by police in June 2008 after DNA tests showed he was the father of M's surviving sons, LJ, CJ and NR. M, LJ, CJ and NR were taken into the care of the Victorian authorities.

RSJ appeared in court in November 2009, where he pleaded guilty to ten counts of incest, two counts of indecent assault of a girl under the age of 16, and one count of common assault. He also asked for the remaining 70 counts against him to be taken into consideration.

During his sentencing in February 2010, County Court Judge Susan Pullen said:
"You defiled your daughter over many years on a regular basis. Your offending involved a gross breach of trust. To describe your treatment of your daughter as appalling is a gross understatement."

RSJ was sentenced to 22 years and five months' imprisonment with a non-parole period of 18 years, and  ordered to be placed on the sex offender registry for the rest of his life. With time in custody taken into account, he will be eligible for parole in February 2027 at the age of 83, and the sentence will expire in July 2031 when he is 88 years of age. 

His appeal against the sentence was dismissed on 29 June 2012.

See also
Colt clan incest case
Fritzl case
Goler clan

References

2009 crimes in Australia
People convicted of incest
Rape in Australia
Child abuse incidents and cases